Sir Arthur Henry Froom (15 January 1873 – 29 October 1964) was a British businessman and political figure in British India.

Educated at St Paul's School, he entered the service of the Peninsular and Oriental Steam Navigation Company in 1890; from 1912 to 1916, he was the company's Bombay superintendent. From 1916 to 1930, he was a partner in Mackinnon, Mackenzie & Co. He was Chairman of the Bombay Chamber of Commerce in 1920; the same year, he became a member of the Imperial Legislative Council. From 1921 to 1930, he was a member of the Council of State. He was knighted in 1922.

References 

 
 

1873 births
1964 deaths
20th-century British businesspeople
Knights Bachelor
Members of the Council of State (India)
20th-century Indian businesspeople
People educated at St Paul's School, London
British people in colonial India